Driving at Night may refer to:
"Driving at Night", a song in the musical State Fair
"Driving at Night", a song by Jaws from the album The Ceiling
"Driving at Night", a song by Joe Satriani from the album Not of This Earth